Giovanni Roberti (3 February 1909 – 18 January 2010) was an Italian politician.

Biography
Giovanni Roberti was born in 1909 in Naples.

During the Second World War he was captured by the British and interned in the Hereford concentration camp (known as "Fascists' criminal camp") in Texas.

A Labor lawyer and professor of labor legislation at the University of Naples, he was co-founder and president from 1950 and secretary general from 1964 to 1977 of CISNAL, the union close to the positions of national syndicalism.

Roberti was elected in 1948 to the Chamber of Deputies in the constituency of Naples among the ranks of the Italian Social Movement and he sat uninterruptedly in Montecitorio from the first to the seventh parliamentary legislature (1976–1979). In 1977 he joined the National Democracy party. Since 1979, after the election defeat of National Democracy, he retired from politics.

In 1988 he published the volume "The right-wing opposition in Italy, 1946–1979".

He died on 18 January 2010, at the age of 100.

References

1909 births
2010 deaths
Politicians from Naples
Italian Social Movement politicians
National Democracy (Italy) politicians
Deputies of Legislature I of Italy
Deputies of Legislature II of Italy
Deputies of Legislature III of Italy
Deputies of Legislature IV of Italy
Deputies of Legislature V of Italy
Deputies of Legislature VI of Italy
Deputies of Legislature VII of Italy
Italian military personnel of World War II
Italian prisoners of war
World War II prisoners of war held by the United Kingdom
Italian centenarians
Men centenarians